Bohuslav Hykš (born 7 May 1889, date of death unknown) was a Czech tennis player. He competed for Bohemia at the 1908 and 1912 Summer Olympics and for Czechoslovakia at the 1920 Summer Olympics.

References

External links
 

1889 births
Year of death missing
Czechoslovak male tennis players
Olympic tennis players of Bohemia
Olympic tennis players of Czechoslovakia
Tennis players at the 1908 Summer Olympics
Tennis players at the 1912 Summer Olympics
Tennis players at the 1920 Summer Olympics
Tennis players from Prague